Arius nudidens is a species of sea catfish in the family Ariidae. It was described by Max Carl Wilhelm Weber in 1913. It is known from freshwater in New Guinea and Indonesia.

References

Ariidae
Taxa named by Max Carl Wilhelm Weber
Fish described in 1913